{{DISPLAYTITLE:TEX86}}

TEX86 is an organic paleothermometer based upon the membrane lipids of mesophilic marine Nitrososphaerota (formerly Marine Group 1 Crenarchaeota).

Basics
The membrane lipids of Nitrososphaerota are composed of glycerol dialkyl glycerol tetraethers (GDGTs) which contain 0-3 cyclopentane moieties. Nitrososphaerota also synthesise crenarchaeol which contains four cyclopentane moieties and a single cyclohexane moiety and a regio-isomer. The cyclohexane and cyclopentane rings, formed by internal cyclisation of one of the biphytane chains, have a pronounced effect on the thermal transition points of the Nitrososphaerota cell membrane. Mesocosm studies demonstrate that the degree of cyclisation is generally governed by growth temperature.

Calibrations
Based upon the relative distribution of isoprenoidal GDGTs, Schouten et al. (2002) proposed the tetraether index of 86 carbon atoms (TEX86) as a proxy for sea surface temperature (SST). GDGT-0 is excluded from the calibration as it can have multiple sources  while GDGT-4 is omitted as it exhibits no correlation with SST and is often an order of magnitude more abundant than its isomer and the other GDGTs. The most recent TEX86 calibration invokes two separate indices and calibrations: TEX86H uses the same combination of GDGTs as in the original TEX86 relationship:

GDGT ratio-2 is correlated to SST using the calibration equation: 
TEX86H = 68.4×log(GDGT ratio-2) + 38.6. 
TEX86H has a calibration error of ±2.5 °C and is based upon 255 core-top sediments.

TEX86L employs a combination of GDGTs that is different from TEX86H, removing GDGT-3 from the numerator and excluding GDGT-4’ entirely:

GDGT ratio-1 is correlated to SST using the calibration equation:
TEX86L = 67.5×log(GDGT ratio-1) + 46.9. 
TEX86Lhas a calibration error of ±4 °C and is based upon 396 core-top sediment samples.

Other calibrations exist (including 1/TEX86, TEX86' and pTEX86 ) and should be considered when reconstructing temperature.

Caveats
There are several caveats to this proxy and this list is by no means exhaustive. For more information, consult

Terrestrial input
The branched vs isoprenoidal tetratether (BIT) index can used to measure the relative fluvial input of terrestrial organic matter (TOM) into the marine realm (Hopmans et al., 2004). The BIT index is based upon the premise that GDGT-4 (also known as crenarchaeol) is derived from marine-dwelling Nitrososphaerota and branched GDGTs are derived from terrestrial soil bacteria. When BIT values exceed 0.4, a deviation of >2 °C is incorporated into TEX86 SST estimates. However, isoprenoidal GDGTs can be synthesised in the terrestrial environment and can render BIT values unreliable (Weijers et al., 2006; Sluijs et al., 2007; Xie et al., 2012). A strong co-variation between GDGT-4 and branched GDGTs in modern marine and freshwater environments also suggests a common or mixed source for isoprenoidal and branched GDGTs (Fietz et al., 2012).

Anaerobic Oxidation of Methane (AOM)
The Methane Index (MI) was proposed to help distinguish the relative input of methanotrophic Euryarchaeota in settings characterised by diffuse methane flux and anaerobic oxidation of methane (AOM) (Zhang et al., 2011). These sites are characterised by a distinct GDGT distribution, namely the predominance of GDGT-1. -2 and -3. High MI values (>0.5) reflect high rates of gas-hydrate-related AOM.

Degradation
Thermal maturity is only thought to affect GDGTs when temperature exceed 240 °C. This can be tested using a ratio of specific hopane isomers. Oxic degradation, which is a selective process and degrades compounds at different rates, has been shown to affect TEX86 values and can bias SST values by up to 6 °C.

Application
The oldest TEX86 record is from the middle Jurassic (~160Ma) and indicates relatively warm sea surface temperatures. TEX86 has been used to reconstruct temperature throughout the Cenozoic era (65-0Ma) and is useful when other SST proxies are diagenetically altered (e.g. planktonic foraminifera) or absent (e.g. alkenones)

Eocene
TEX86 has been extensively used to reconstruct Eocene (55-34Ma) SST. During the early Eocene, TEX86 values indicate warm high southern hemisphere latitude SSTs (20-25 °C) in agreement  with other, independently derived proxies (e.g. alkenones, CLAMP, Mg/Ca). During the middle and late Eocene, high southern latitude sites cooled while the tropics remained stable and warm. Possible reasons for this cooling include long-term changes in carbon dioxide and/or changes in gateway reorganisation (e.g. Tasman Gateway, Drake Passage).

References

Further reading 

Paleoclimatology